The Berger Elite League is the premier domestic netball league in Jamaica. Inaugurated in 2013, the league is contested by 6 teams (two under 21 teams were added in 2017 in preparation for the 2017 Netball World Youth Cup). The new domestic league was launched by Netball Jamaica in 2013, making it the first professional netball league within the Caribbean region.

Teams
The Berger Elite League consist of six teams from different parishes within Jamaica. In the 2016/2017 season, two Under 21 teams, the U21 Suns and U21 Shiners were added to the league in preparation for the 2017 Netball World Youth Cup.

Current teams

1.Two under 21 teams were added to the league in 2016/2017 season in preparation for the 2017 Netball World Youth Cup but won't compete in the 2017/2018 season.

Format
The Berger Elite League takes place from early December to late January to avoid interruption among international netball events such as test matches, Netball World Cup, Fast5 Netball World Series, Caribbean Championship. The Grand Finale is determined by a three-game series and all games take place at one venue per round, either outdoor at the Leila Robinson Courts or indoor at the National Indoor Sports Complex.

Media coverage
Netball Jamaica has partnered with SportsMax TV in broadcasting selected matches within Jamaica and the Caribbean region. Also, all elimination rounds and finals are televised live on SportsMax TV.

Winners 
2014/2015 - Kingston Hummingbirds
2015/2016 - Clarendon Gaters
2016/2017 - St. Ann Orchids
2017/2018 - Kingston Hummingbirds
2018/2019 - Manchester Spurs

See also
Netball in the Americas
Netball Jamaica

References

 http://www.jamaicaobserver.com/sports/berger-elite-league-draws-new-teams_116711?profile=1511

Netball competitions in Jamaica
Netball leagues
Sports leagues in Jamaica
Sports leagues established in 2013